The 1949–50 NBA season was the fourth and final season for the Bombers in the National Basketball Association. The franchise ceased operations after the season, and the St. Louis market would be left without an NBA team until 1955.

NBA Draft

Roster

|-
! colspan="2" style="background-color: #D0103A;  color: #FFFFFF; text-align: center;" | St. Louis Bombers 1949–50 roster
|- style="background-color: #FFFFFF; color: #D0103A;   text-align: center;"
! Players !! Coaches
|- 
| valign="top" |

! Pos. !! # !! Nat. !! Name !! Ht. !! Wt. !! From
|-

Regular season

Season standings

Record vs. opponents

Game log

References

St. Louis Bombers (NBA) seasons
St. Louis